Godfrey Walusimbi (born 3 July 1989) is a Ugandan professional footballer who plays as a left-back for the Uganda national team. He is the first Ugandan footballer to play more than 100 international matches.

Club career
In June 2011 Walusimbi went to Sweden for a two-week trial with Allsvenskan side BK Häcken.

CS Don Bosco
In January 2013, he left Bunamwaya for DR Congo side CS Don Bosco. Having spent a few months with the team, he canceled his contract in response to the poor working conditions. He returned to his former team SC Villa.

Gor Mahia
In December 2013, Walusimbi joined Kenyan Premier League champions Gor Mahia where coached by former Uganda national team coach Bobby Williamson.

Kaizer Chiefs
In August 2018, Walusimbi moved to South African Premier Division club Kaizer Chiefs, signing a three-year contract. The reported cost of the transfer was around 4.4 million South African rand. He made his league debut for the club on 18 September 2018, playing all ninety minutes in a 2–0 away victory over Free State Stars. In January 2019, Walusimbi left the club, electing to return home to his native Uganda.

Vllaznia
In September 2019, Walusimbi joined Albanian Superliga side KF Vllaznia Shkodër on a one-year contract. He left the club at the end of the season.

International career
On 4 September 2010, Walusimbi made his Uganda national team debut in the 2012 Africa Cup of Nations qualifier against Angola as a replacement for the injured Nestory Kizito. On 16 April 2011, he helped the Uganda U23 Team to a 2–1 first leg victory over Tanzania in the All Africa Games qualifier with excellent performance in which he created the first goal with some creative work on the left flank. On 4 June 2011, he scored against Guinea-Bissau in a crucial 2012 Africa Cup of Nations qualification game. The goal was the first in a 2–0 win for the cranes which saw them top Group J in front of a packed Mandela National Stadium.

Career statistics

International

See also
 List of men's footballers with 100 or more international caps

References

External links
 
 

1989 births
Living people
Sportspeople from Kampala
Association football defenders
Ugandan footballers
Uganda international footballers
2017 Africa Cup of Nations players
2019 Africa Cup of Nations players
SC Villa players
CS Don Bosco players
Gor Mahia F.C. players
Kaizer Chiefs F.C. players
KF Vllaznia Shkodër players
Ugandan expatriate footballers
Expatriate footballers in the Democratic Republic of the Congo
Ugandan expatriate sportspeople in the Democratic Republic of the Congo
Expatriate footballers in Kenya
Ugandan expatriate sportspeople in Kenya
Expatriate soccer players in South Africa
Ugandan expatriate sportspeople in South Africa
Expatriate footballers in Albania
Ugandan expatriate sportspeople in Albania
FIFA Century Club